Sparganothina inbiana is a species of moth of the family Tortricidae. It is found in Costa Rica.

The length of the forewings is 8.5–9 mm for males and 9.4–10 mm for females. The forewings are bright yellow with brown and orange markings. The hindwings are pale greyish brown with a pattern of darker brown lines.

Etymology
The species name refers to the Instituto Nacional de Biodiversidad.

References

Moths described in 2001
Sparganothini